Myersiohyla neblinaria, the neblina tree frog, is a frog in the family Hylidae, endemic to Venezuela and possibly Brazil.  Scientists have seen it between 1250 and 2100 meters above sea level.

Original description

References

Endemic fauna of Venezuela
Amphibians described in 2013
Frogs of South America
neblinaria